Warsama Hassan Houssein (born 17 May 2000) is a Djiboutian professional footballer who plays for Djiboutian side Arta/Solar7 and the Djibouti national team.

Club career
Born in Djibouti, Hassan joined the Standard Liège youth system in 2007. In 2015, he moved to Genk, playing in the club's academy for four years. On 2 January 2019, Hassan signed for Belgian First Amateur Division club Seraing on a two-year contract.

In October 2020 Hassan joined Sereď of the Slovak Fortuna Liga. With the move he became the first player from Djibouti to sign for a top-flight club in Europe. It was announced in August 2021 that Hassan had signed for Maltese Premier League club Sliema Wanderers FC on a one-year contract with a club option for an additional year.

International career
Hassan previously represented Belgium at under-15 and under-16 levels. In 2014 he made three friendly appearances for the U15 side, two against Turkey and one against Italy. In April 2016 he made one under-17 appearance in a friendly against the Czech Republic. Hassan made his senior debut for Djibouti in a 2–1 FIFA World Cup qualification win against Eswatini on 4 September 2019.

Career statistics

International goals
Scores and results list Djibouti's goal tally first.

International career statistics

References

External links
 
 

2000 births
Living people
People from Djibouti (city)
Naturalised citizens of Belgium
Djiboutian footballers
Belgian footballers
Belgium youth international footballers
Djibouti international footballers
Association football fullbacks
Association football midfielders
R.F.C. Seraing (1922) players
ŠKF Sereď players
Sliema Wanderers F.C. players
AS Arta/Solar7 players
Belgian Third Division players
Maltese Premier League players
Djibouti Premier League players
Djiboutian expatriate footballers
Expatriate footballers in Slovakia
Djiboutian expatriate sportspeople in Slovakia
Expatriate footballers in Malta
Djiboutian expatriate sportspeople in Malta
Expatriate footballers in Belgium
Djiboutian expatriate sportspeople in Belgium